Cubero is a census-designated place  in Cibola County, New Mexico, United States. Its population was 289 as of the 2010 census. Cubero has a post office with ZIP code 87014. The town was founded by Mexicans and was along the route of the Santa Fe Railroad's first transcontinental rail line through the Southwestern United States.

Geography

Climate

Demographics

References

Census-designated places in New Mexico
Census-designated places in Cibola County, New Mexico